{{DISPLAYTITLE:C8H10O4}}
The molecular formula C8H10O4 (molar mass: 170.16 g/mol, exact mass: 107.0579 u) may refer to:

 Dihydroxyphenylethylene glycol, a phenolic human metabolic
 Penicillic acid

Molecular formulas